Noreia is a genus of moths in the family Geometridae first described by Francis Walker in 1861.

Description
Palpi upturned and reaching vertex of head. Antennae of male ciliated. Hind tibia with a slight ridge of scales on inner side. Forewings with vein 3 from before angle of cell and veins 7 to 10 stalked. Vein 11 anastomosing (fusing) with vein 12, then with vein 10, which again anastomosing with veins 8 and 9. Hindwings with vein 3 from just before angle of cell, vein 7 from just before upper angle.

Species
Noreia ajaia (Walker, 1859)
Noreia unilineata (Walker, 1866)
Noreia achloraria (Warren, 1894)
Noreia anacardium Holloway, 1996
Noreia sinuilineata Holloway, 1996
Noreia albifimbria Warren, 1897
Noreia vinacea Warren, 1899

References

Desmobathrinae